Marlon Almiro Grings (born July 16, 1976) is a Brazilian slalom canoer who competed in the early-to-mid 1990s. He finished 30th in the K-1 event at the 1992 Summer Olympics in Barcelona.

References
Sports-Reference.com profile

1976 births
Brazilian male canoeists
Canoeists at the 1992 Summer Olympics
Living people
Olympic canoeists of Brazil
Place of birth missing (living people)
20th-century Brazilian people